Into the Sea is the first studio album by Attalus. Facedown Records released the album on June 2, 2015.

Critical reception

Ian Webber, indicating in an eight out of ten review by Cross Rhythms, says, "Beautiful, moody, moving and sensitive, this is a recording that at its best demands your attention, but can also outstay its welcome as some of the material included could have been lost without affecting the overall feel and message of the package." Awarding the album four stars from Jesus Freak Hideout, Michael Weaver writes, "Into the Sea manages to keep a central theme with the nautical references and, on top of that, does a nice job of keeping it fresh the entire time."

Christopher Smith, giving the album four stars for Jesus Freak Hideout, states, "musically as heavy as their label mates...Into The Sea is an ambitious concept album". Rating the album four and a half stars at Jesus Freak Hideout, David Craft describes, "Into the Sea defines itself in a fashion which most concept albums only dream of." Scott Swan, awarding the album five stars by Indie Vision Music, says, "Attalus has taken great care in creating a lasting piece that will live on, likely providing continued discoveries for many listens to come."

Track listing

Chart performance

References

2015 debut albums
Facedown Records albums
Attalus (band) albums